The Mentor was a brig bought by Thomas Bruce, 7th Earl of Elgin, in order to transport antiquities from Athens. The cargo included a significant number of sculptures from the Parthenon.

Cargo

Commanded by Captain William Eglen, it left Piraeus on 5 January 1802 with numerous boxes full of antiquities, including:

 3 marble torsos (Parthenon)
 a piece of the Parthenon "wingless victory" frieze
 a marble throne

Sinking

The ship sailed a longer route than to pick up additional cargo. Having spent the night at Cape Matapan, the ship departed during strong easterly winds, and aimed to anchor at Kythira, but the bad weather meant it could not dock at the small port of  Avlemonas and it swung onto the rocks. The crew and passengers were saved by a nearby boat, but the Mentor and its cargo sunk to a depth of 23 meters.

Recovery attempts

Between 2011 and 2016, divers organized by the Greek Ephorate of Underwater Antiquities uncovered some of the sunken antiquities.

References

Shipwrecks
Shipwrecks containing antiquities
Parthenon